The Edinburgh–Dundee line is a railway line linking Edinburgh with Dundee via the Forth Bridge and the Tay Bridge. A branch runs to Perth. Passenger services are operated by ScotRail, Caledonian Sleeper, CrossCountry and London North Eastern Railway.

Route 

Part of the route is shared with other services:
 Fife Circle Line between Edinburgh Waverley and Markinch

The majority of the line is double track. Between the junction with the Glasgow–Edinburgh via Falkirk line and Edinburgh Waverley, the line is quadruple-tracked.

Historical 
The route comprises the following historical railway lines:
 Edinburgh and Glasgow Railway between Edinburgh and Saughton Junction
 Forth Bridge Connecting Lines of the North British Railway between Saughton Junction and Dalmeny Junction
 Forth Bridge Railway between Dalmeny Junction and Inverkeithing South Junction
 Dunfermline and Queensferry Railway between Inverkeithing South Junction and Inverkeithing Central Junction
 Aberdour Line of the North British Railway between Inverkeithing Central Junction and 
 Edinburgh and Northern Railway between Burntisland and Leuchars North Junction
 Tay Bridge and associated lines of the North British Railway between Leuchars North Junction and Dundee

In detail

Electrification 
Currently, the only electrified section is that in Edinburgh shared with the lines to Glasgow.

Work to electrify the section between Dalmeny railway station and the junction with the Glasgow lines began in June 2022 and is expected to be completed by December 2024.

Services

2015 
There is an hourly service between Edinburgh and Aberdeen (17 trains in total) for most of the day. Most services are provided by ScotRail (8 of which extend to Inverurie, one continuing on from there to Inverness). 4 services are provided by LNER which provide services to/from Aberdeen of which 3 run to London King's Cross while 1 runs to Leeds. CrossCountry provides 1 train per day to Aberdeen from Plymouth while one runs from Aberdeen to Penzance and to Edinburgh. On Sundays, a limited service is provided by ScotRail who run 5 trains per day, LNER run 4 and CrossCountry run 1 service. On Monday-Saturday there is an hourly regional service from Edinburgh to Dundee, serving smaller Fife stations.

References

External links 
 

Transport in Edinburgh
Transport in Fife
Transport in Angus, Scotland
Transport in Aberdeenshire
Railway lines in Scotland
Standard gauge railways in Scotland